Poruba is an administrative district of the city of Ostrava, Moravian-Silesian Region in the Czech Republic. It lies in the Silesian part of the city.

It lies in the historical region of Silesia and was first mentioned in a written document in 1377.

Heavy industrialization of Ostrava in the second half of the 19th century didn't have major impact on Poruba which retained its agricultural character. Several factories were built here at the beginning of the 20th century.

According to the Austrian census of 1910 the village had 1,403 inhabitants, 1,401 of whom had permanent residence there. Census asked people for their native language, 1,381 (98.6%) were Czech-speaking. Most populous religious group were Roman Catholics with 1,392 (99.2%).

Major event in the history of Poruba was a decision of communist authorities to build here a large complex of apartment buildings which were supposed to house workers who came to Ostrava from various parts of the country in large numbers after World War II. The construction began in the early 1950s. At its peak almost 100,000 people lived in Poruba, today about 74,000 people live there. It is one of the most populous districts of the city and is known for its shopping district.

Poruba was formerly an independent municipality, in 1957 it became a part of Ostrava.

Most important cultural landmarks of Poruba are Saint Nicholas Church and Poruba Castle.

Footnotes

References

External links

  Official website

Ostrava
Neighbourhoods in the Czech Republic